Rayvon Owen (born June 27, 1991) is an American singer and musician. He is notable for appearing on the 14th season of American Idol, where he finished fourth in voting. Owen served as the host for TBS's reality competition series The Sims Spark'd.

Early life
Rayvon Owen was born in Richmond, Virginia on June 27, 1991. He graduated from Henrico High School and Belmont University and worked as a singer and vocal coach.

Music career

2014: Early career 
Rayvon has his own music video, "Sweatshirt" which premiered in November 2014. He also has a debut EP Cycles.

2015: American Idol 
He auditioned for the fourteenth season of American Idol with "Wide Awake" by Katy Perry and was chosen for Top 24 and eventually Top 12. After being in the bottom three in the top 11, (which guaranteed two people would be eliminated), Owen was deemed safe. Owen was in the bottom two for five consecutive weeks, but emerged victorious, thanks to the Idol Twitter Fan Save, where the bottom two perform and fans vote on Twitter for who should advance. Owen was the only recipient of the fan save in the entire season earning him the nicknames "Twitter King" and "Comeback Kid". Owen finished in fourth place and was included on the Idols Live Tour.

Performances and results

 When Ryan Seacrest announced the results in the particular night, Owen was in the bottom 3, but was the only contestant declared safe as both Adanna Duru and Maddie Walker were eliminated.
 When Ryan Seacrest announced the results for this particular night, Owen was in the bottom 2, but was declared safe by Twitter vote as Daniel Seavey was eliminated.
 When Ryan Seacrest announced the results for this particular night, Owen was in the bottom 2, but was declared safe by Twitter vote as Qaasim Middleton was eliminated.
 When Ryan Seacrest announced the results for this particular night, Owen was in the bottom 2, but was declared safe by Twitter vote as Joey Cook was eliminated.
 When Ryan Seacrest announced the results for this particular night, Owen was in the bottom 2, but was declared safe by Twitter vote as Quentin Alexander was eliminated.
 When Ryan Seacrest announced the results for this particular night, Owen was in the bottom 2, but was declared safe as Tyanna Jones was eliminated.

2016-present: New music 
On the Valentine's Day weekend of 2016, Owen debuted a new single, "Can't Fight It" written with Mylen, Nate Merchant, and Isaiah Tejada. The accompanying music video acts as his official "coming out" as gay, sharing a kiss at the end with LGBT activist Shane Bitney Crone. Owen told Billboard: "You’d be surprised at the amount of times I tried to pray the gay away from me or tried to tell God to take this away from me. No kid should have to do what I did and pray to not be who they are. That’s why I think it’s important even in 2016 to say this."

In January 2018, Owen was picked as Elvis Duran's Artist of the Month. He was featured on the Today where he performed his single "Gold."

Personal life
On February 14, 2016, Owen premiered a music video for his song "Can't Fight It", at the end of which he kisses a man. That same day, Owen's interview with Billboard was published in which he came out as gay. One day later, Shane Bitney Crone, who is featured as the romantic lead in the music video, announced that he and Owen are a couple. On March 3, 2018, they announced they would be getting married, after Crone proposed to Owen on stage at a Demi Lovato concert.

Discography

EPs

Singles
2016: "Can't Fight It"
2018: "Gold"
2020: "Space Between" (with Blair St. Clair)

Digital singles

References

1991 births
Living people
American Idol participants
American gay musicians
LGBT African Americans
LGBT people from Virginia
American LGBT singers
Musicians from Richmond, Virginia
Henrico High School alumni
20th-century LGBT people
21st-century LGBT people
21st-century African-American male singers